Hosono (written: 細野) is a Japanese surname. Notable people with the surname include:

, Japanese manga artist
, Japanese politician
, Japanese musician
, Japanese scientist
, Japanese civil servant and RMS Titanic passenger
, Japanese voice actress
, Japanese voice actress, actress and singer

Japanese-language surnames